is an action role-playing video game developed by FromSoftware for the PlayStation. It was released in Japan by FromSoftware in 1995, in North America by ASCII Entertainment and in Europe by Sony Computer Entertainment in 1996. It is the second entry in the King's Field series and the first one released internationally. Since the original King's Field was released only in Japan, the English language version of King's Field II was retitled King's Field.

Story

The game takes place on the island of Melanat. The player takes the role of Granitiki prince Aleph (アレフ・ガルーシャ・レグナス) (alternatively named Alef/Alexander), who has taken it upon himself, as one of the king of Verdite's closest friends, to retrieve the holy sword known as the Moonlight Sword, and return it to King Alfred of the kingdom of Verdite. Aleph is washed up on the coast of Melanat, as the sole survivor after the ship he came with sank into the ocean. To find the Moonlight Sword, Aleph must press ever forward and uncover the secrets the dark island of Melanat holds.

Reception

On release, the Japanese gaming magazine Famicom Tsūshin scored the game a 35 out of 40. One of Electronic Gaming Monthlys four reviewers remarked, "This title has all the great aspects of a true RPG, including items to pick up and equip, but also has an adventure feel to it because of the strategy used in doing battle with the enemies." Though one of the reviewers complained about the player character's slow movement, another two felt it added to the realism. A GamePro reviewer took the negative side on the issue, arguing that "Chasing monsters is one thing, but chasing them in slow motion while they speed up to kill you is a different matter." He also criticized the slowly charging weapon bar and the graphical similarity of the levels and monsters, and compared the game unfavorably to DeathKeep, another first-person dungeon crawling RPG which was released for the 3DO at around the same time. A Next Generation critic complained that the battles "are slow and meticulous, and ... lack a lot of the strategy involved in most RPG battles", but gave the game a strong overall recommendation. He complimented the graphics, sound, and RPG elements, but found the game's best aspect as the ability to freely look around and explore every corner of the massive 3D world with no load times.

References

External links
Agetec King's Field (U.S.) listing

1995 video games
PlayStation (console) games
PlayStation Network games
Role-playing video games
King's Field
Video games developed in Japan
Video games set on fictional islands
Single-player video games